is a Prefectural Natural Park in Akita Prefecture, Japan.

See also
 National Parks of Japan
 Parks and gardens in Akita Prefecture

References

Parks and gardens in Akita Prefecture
Protected areas established in 1968
1968 establishments in Japan
Kitaakita